Yu Shiqie is a Chinese spirit or goddess of rain. She appears in the Classic of Mountains and Seas as the leader of a country called Yu Shi (雨师国); her "name" is a title indicating that she is the concubine of Yu Shi.

Legend
According to the Classic of Mountains and Seas, Yu Shiqie exists in the north. Her skin is black and she holds a snake in each hand. In her left ear is a green snake and in her right ear, a red snake. Also, the Classic of Mountains and Seas refers to "One said that in the north of the ten suns, to the north of the ten suns, there is a black-bodied, human-faced person, whose each [hand] holds a turtle." This version refers to Yu Shiqie holding turtles instead of snakes.

References

 Chinese deities
 Chinese goddesses